is a Japanese professional golfer. He was elected to the World Golf Hall of Fame in 2004.

Career
Aoki was born in Abiko, Chiba, Japan. He was introduced to golf while caddying at the Abiko Golf Club as a schoolboy. He turned professional in 1964. He went on to win more than fifty events on the Japan Golf Tour between 1972 and 1990, trailing only Masashi "Jumbo" Ozaki on the list of golfers with most Japan Golf Tour wins. He won the Japan Golf Tour money list five times in six years: 1976, 1978, 1979, 1980, and 1981. His career earnings are 980 million yen.

In 1983, Aoki won the Hawaiian Open on the U.S.-based PGA Tour, the first Japanese and Asian player to win on the tour, and the Panasonic European Open on the European Tour. He also won the prestigious World Match Play Championship in England in 1978, which was not a European Tour event at that time, and picked up a win on the PGA Tour of Australasia. Aoki is also one of the nine players in the history of the Open Championship to shoot a round of just 63 shots (which he achieved in the third round of the 1980 event). Despite this being the joint-best round in the history of the tournament at the time, Aoki would only finish tied for 12th that year.

Aoki played 165 times on the PGA Tour between 1974 and 1999, primarily from 1981 to 1990. His best finish in a major championship was a second-place finish to Jack Nicklaus (by two strokes) in the 1980 U.S. Open. That finish, combined with his recent record in Japan and around the globe, meant that Aoki would finish 1980 ranked third in the unofficial McCormack's World Golf Rankings, a position he would hold at the end of 1981. After the Official World Golf Rankings debuted in 1986, he was ranked in the top-10 for several weeks in 1987.

In December 1984 after receiving an invitation from Gary Player, Aoki traveled to South Africa to participate in the Million Dollar Challenge. Aoki did this in spite of the efforts of the Japanese government to dissuade him from making the trip.

As a senior, Aoki has played primarily in the United States on the Champions Tour, winning nine times between 1992 and 2003. He has eight senior victories outside the United States, including five victories in the Japan Senior Open where he shot his age, 65, during his most recent triumph in 2007.

Professional wins (80)

PGA Tour wins (1)

European Tour wins (1)

Japan Golf Tour wins (51)

*Note: Tournament shortened to 36/63 holes due to weather.
1Co-sanctioned by the Asia Golf Circuit

Japan Golf Tour playoff record (4–9)

PGA Tour of Australasia wins (1)

Other wins (8)
 1971 Kanto Pro Championship (Japan)
 1972 Kanto Pro Championship (Japan)
 1973 Gold Beck
 1977 Jun Classic
 1978 Colgate World Match Play Championship (England)
 1982 Old Sones Invitational, Daikyo Open
 1987 Fred Meyer Challenge (with Payne Stewart)

Senior PGA Tour wins (9)

Senior PGA Tour playoff record (1–4)

Japan Senior PGA Tour wins (9)
 1994 Japan Senior Open
 1995 American Express Grand Slam, Japan Senior Open
 1996 Japan Senior Open
 1997 Japan Senior Open
 2000 N. Cup Senior Open
 2002 N. Cup Senior Open
 2007 Japan Senior Open
 2008 Kinojo Senior Open

Results in major championships

CUT = missed the half-way cut (3rd round cut in 1977 Open Championship)
"T" = tied

Summary

 Most consecutive cuts made – 7 (1988 Masters – 1990 U.S. Open)
 Longest streak of top-10s – 1 (five times)

Results in The Players Championship

CUT = missed the halfway cut
"T" indicates a tie for a place

Results in senior major championships
Results not in chronological order before 2012.

CUT = missed the halfway cut
DQ = disqualified
"T" indicates a tie for a place
Note: The Senior British Open Championship did not become a major until 2003.

Team appearances
 World Cup (representing Japan): 1973, 1974
 Alfred Dunhill Cup (representing Japan): 1985, 1999, 2000
 Nissan Cup/Kirin Cup (representing Japan): 1985, 1987, 1988
 UBS Warburg Cup (representing the Rest of the World): 2001, 2002
 Dynasty Cup (representing Japan): 2003 (non-playing captain), 2005 (non-playing captain)

Honours
 Member of the World Golf Hall of Fame (2004)
 Medal with Purple Ribbon (2008)
 Order of the Rising Sun, 4th Class, Gold Rays with Rosette (2015)

See also
 List of golfers with most Japan Golf Tour wins

References

External links
  
 
 
 
 
 
 My Philosophy No.74 Isao Aoki | InterLiteracy

Japanese male golfers
Japan Golf Tour golfers
PGA Tour golfers
PGA Tour Champions golfers
World Golf Hall of Fame inductees
Recipients of the Medal with Purple Ribbon
Sportspeople from Chiba Prefecture
People from Abiko, Chiba
1942 births
Living people